Pulaski is a British television drama series produced by the BBC in 1987.

Created by Roy Clarke, the series was a parody of detective dramas centred around Larry Summers, an American actor starring in a British detective series in the title role of Pulaski, who finds himself involved in real life cases. He was assisted by his co-star Kate Smith, who played his sidekick Briggsy in the series.

The theme music was performed by The Shadows.

Cast

 David Andrews - Larry Summers/Pulaski
 Caroline Langrishe - Kate Smith/Briggsy
 Kate Harper - Paula Wilson
 Rolf Saxon - Jerome Summers

Episodes

References

External links
 

BBC television dramas
1980s British drama television series
1987 British television series debuts
1987 British television series endings
Detective television series
English-language television shows